A race track is a purpose-built facility for the conducting of races.

Race track or racetrack may also refer to:

 Racetrack (film), a 1933 American pre-Code drama
 Racetrack (game), a paper and pencil game
 Racetrack memory, a device for storing bits in a magnetic racetrack
 Racetrack Records, an American record label

Places in the United States
 Racetrack, Montana, a census-designated place
 Racetrack, North Bergen, a neighborhood in Hudson County, New Jersey
 Racetrack Playa, an area of moving rocks in Death Valley, California

See also
 RaceTrac, a discount brand of gasoline and chain of convenience stores situated across the United States